This is a list of works by Peder Severin Krøyer, depicting the artistic career of Krøyer spread over a period of roughly 35 years, from 1866 until his death in 1909.

List

Paintings

Drawings

References

Kroyer
Paintings by Peder Severin Krøyer